Craig Barry Anderson (born February 12, 1942) is a retired American bishop of the Episcopal Church who served as the Bishop of South Dakota from 1984 to 1992.

Early life and career
Anderson was born in Glendale, California, on February 12, 1942. He studied at Valparaiso University, from where he graduated with a Bachelor of Arts degree in 1963. He then joined the United States Army. He graduated from the University of the South in theology in 1974. He also graduated with a Master of Arts in 1981, and a Doctor of Philosophy in 1985 from Valparaiso University.

Ordained ministry
Anderson was ordained deacon in 1974 and priest in 1975. He then became an army chaplain in 1976, and taught at the University of the South. He also held the C. K. Benedict Chair of Theology from 1978 to 1984. He was also head of the admissions committee and chaired the senior program. Subsequently, he served as priest-in-charge at Christ Church in Alto, Tennessee.

Bishop
Anderson was elected Bishop of South Dakota in March 1984, and was consecrated on July 27, 1984, at the Cathedral of Our Lady of Perpetual Help, Rapid City, South Dakota, by Bishop John Allin. He remained in South Dakota until his resignation in 1992, to become the eleventh president, dean and Professor of Theology at the General Theological Seminary in New York City. In 1998, he resigned his position at the seminary to become the eleventh headmaster of St. Paul's School in Concord, New Hampshire. Subsequently, he served as interim bishop in the Diocese of Vermont. In 2005, Anderson retired from St Paul's, two years ahead of schedule, over his compensation, handling of the school's money and other matters. This came about when the school came under investigation by tax authorities after falling short of its fund-raising goals. He then became the assistant bishop in the Diocese of Idaho and interim rector of St Thomas' Church in Sun Valley, Idaho. In 2007, he became rector of Emmanuel Church on Orcas Island, and served as assistant bishop in the Diocese of Olympia, until 2014. He then moved with his family to Taos, New Mexico.

References

1942 births
Living people
20th-century American Episcopalians
People from Glendale, California
Valparaiso University alumni
Sewanee: The University of the South alumni
Episcopal bishops of South Dakota